Lakelse Lake Wetlands Provincial Park is a provincial park in British Columbia, Canada, located near the city of Terrace in that province's Skeena Country. It is 1214 ha. in size.

References

Skeena Country
Provincial parks of British Columbia
Year of establishment missing